A prototype is something that is representative of a category of things, or an early engineering version of something to be tested.

Prototype may also refer to:

Automobiles
Citroën Prototype C, a range of vehicles created by Citroën from 1955 to 1956
Citroën Prototype Y, a project of replacement of the Citroën Ami studied by Citroën in the early seventies
Daytona Prototype, a sports car
Le Mans Prototype, a class of sports car racing vehicles specifically designed for endurance racing
Sports prototype, a broad category of racing cars designed for sports car racing

Business
Mack Prototype, a wholly owned subsidiary of Mack Group
Prototype (company), a Japanese software company

Science
Prototype-matching, searching for a simplified pattern in objects searched
Prototype theory, a model of graded categorization in cognitive science
Prototype drug, a represent of a class of drugs with similar chemical structure and action mechanism

Computer science
In software engineering:
Software prototyping, the activity of creating prototypes of software applications
In programming:
Function prototype, a declaration of a function that omits the function body but does specify the function's name, arity, and argument types
prototype, a property of all JavaScript objects, through which they can inherit further functionality
Prototype JavaScript Framework, a JavaScript library for the creation of Ajax applications
Prototype-based programming, a style of object-oriented programming in which classes are not present
Prototype pattern, a design pattern similar to the factory method pattern

Music
Prototype (band), a US metal band 
Prototypes (band), a French rock band with hits in France and a US CD release
The Prototypes, a British drum and bass duo
Prototype (Bodies Without Organs album), 2005
Prototype (Experimental Products album), 1982
Prototype (Jeff Lorber album), 2017
Prototype (Wallace Roney album), 2004
"Ghetto Musick / Prototype", a 2003 song by OutKast
Prototypes (album), by Alva Noto, 2000

Film and television
Prototype (1983 film), a TV movie starring Christopher Plummer
Prototype (1992 film), a 1992 science fiction film, also known as Prototype X29A
"Prototype" (Stargate SG-1), an episode from the ninth season of Stargate SG-1
"Prototype" (Star Trek: Voyager), a 1996 episode in the second season of Star Trek: Voyager
"Prototype", an episode from the sixth season of Smallville
"Prototype" (George Lopez), the pilot episode of the television series George Lopez
"Prototype", an episode of Undeclared

Video games
Prototype (series), a video game series
Prototype (video game), the first game in the series

Other fields
"The Prototype", a ring name of professional wrestler John Cena
Prototype, in model building, any real object/system/device, used as a basis for a model, example in the hobby of model railroading
Prototype filter, an electronic filter

See also
Archetype
Proto (disambiguation)